

Business Overview

Kulthorn Kirby (Kulthorn Kirby Public Company Limited) is the manufacturer and distributor of motor compressor, reciprocating type for refrigeration products i.e. refrigerators, freezers, water coolers, commercial refrigerators, and air conditioners. The company produces motor compressor by his own technology under the international management systems. And also the company has continued to increase production capacity and develop new models to serve the market expansion and its requirement in ASEAN, China, Middle East, Australia, U.S. and Africa.

The reciprocating compressor can be used with many types of refrigerant with the sizes from 1/20 horsepower to 10 horsepower. The Company also produces Condensing Unit which is the component of refrigeration products, electrical motor parts, and other motor compressor parts.

The Company and other investors invested and established 6 new companies to produce major parts and raw materials of compressor to replace the import and local purchasing in order to reduce the production costs and to improve product quality, and aim to be the leader in the motor compressor business in ASEAN. And its subsidiaries are as follows.

 Kulthorn Premier Company Limited
 Kulthorn Kirby Foundry Company Limited
 Kulthorn Steel Company Limited
 Kulthorn Metal Products Company Limited
 Kulthorn Materials & Controls Company Limited
Suzhou Kulthorn Magnet Wire Company Limited

History 

1980 – Kulthorn started a joint venture with the Kirby Group of Australia (Lennox) to become the first manufacturer of reciprocating compressors in Thailand.

1987 – Kulthorn started a joint venture with Universal Magnetic (KU) to produce NEMA Frame Motors 

1988 – Kulthorn started a joint venture to produce Rotary Compressors (Thaicom)

1989 – Kulthorn Kirby Foundry was established to produce iron casting (KKF)

1990 – Kulthorn started a joint venture with Hitachi Powdered to produce powdered metal components (KPM)

1990 – Kulthorn Material Company was established to produce copper magnet wire (KMC)

1991 – Kulthorn was listed on the stock exchange of Thailand (KKC)

2004 – Kulthorn acquired Sanyo Compressor factory (KPC)

2007 – Kulthorn Steel was established to produce steel (KSC)

2010 – Kulthorn Electric joined with Unada to develop a range of BLDC motors for the HVAC/R industry

2014 – 40 millionth compressor produced

2016 – Kulthorn Research & Development Center was established

2017 – 90 millionth compressor produced

2018 – 100 millionth compressor produced

2018 – Kulthorn Kirby acquired the intellectual property, brand name, technology and processes of US manufacturer Bristol Compressors International.

Management Team
Chairman of the Board : Mr. Sutee Simakulthorn
President : Mr. Titisak Simakulthorn

See also 
 Reciprocating compressor
 Rotary Compressors
 Kulthorn compressors
 SET50 Index and SET100 Index

External links

References

Manufacturing companies based in Bangkok
Companies listed on the Stock Exchange of Thailand